Bimbo Akintola   (born 5 May 1970) is a Nigerian actress.

Early life and education
Akintola was born on 5 May 1970 to a father from Oyo State and a mother from Edo State. She studied at Maryland Convent Private School in Lagos State. She proceeded to Command Day Secondary School, Lagos. She earned a degree in Theater Arts from University of Ibadan.

Early life 
A family of six includes Abimbola as the third child. She began portraying a student alongside her peers for the school's end-of-year theater events, encouraged by her mother's encouragement. Her enthusiasm for performing intensified as she participated in more plays, eventually becoming second nature.

She was raised in Maryland, Lagos, where she received her elementary education at Maryland Convent Private School and her secondary school at Command Day School, also in Lagos. She completed her undergraduate studies in theatre arts at the University of Ibadan. The actress used to perform every weekend with the late Jaiye Aboderin at a club called Divine on Allen Avenue in Lagos when she was still in school.

Personal life 
Celebrities that Bimbo has dated include actor Yemi Blaq, and musician Dede Mabiaku. Before they started dating, Bimbo and Mabiaku were friends for two years. However, they later broke up amicably.

Career
Her acting debut was when she featured in the film Owo Blow in 1995 alongside Femi Adebayo and followed up with Out of Bounds in 1997 with Richard Mofe Damijo. She was nominated for Best Actress in a Leading Role at the 2013 Nollywood Movies Awards.

Other recognitions for her skills include ;

1. Best Actress or English Actress in Nigeria in 1997.

2. Best Actress Award for the movie Heaven's Hell at the 2015 Eko International Film Festival.

Selected filmography

 Out of Bounds (1997)
Diamond Ring (1998)
 The Gardner (1998)
 Dangerous Twins (2004)
 Beyond the Verdict (2007)
 Smoke and Mirrors (2008)
 Hoodrush (2012)
 Ayitale (2013)
 Heaven's Hell (2015)
 93 Days (2016)
 Husbands of Lagos (2015)
 Circle of Three
 Lady Buckit and the Motley Mopsters
Diamonds In The Sky (2019)
The New Normal (2020)

Television series

References

External links

20th-century Nigerian actresses
21st-century Nigerian actresses
University of Ibadan alumni
Actresses from Ibadan
Living people
Yoruba actresses
Nigerian film actresses
Actresses in Yoruba cinema
1970 births
Nigerian television actresses
Actresses from Oyo State
People from Oyo State